George Oscar Dawson (c. 1825 – June 1865) was a Georgia lawyer and politician who represented Greene County in the state legislature.  He was the third child of Senator William Crosby Dawson.

He entered the Civil War  as a Captain with the Greene County "Stephens Light Guards", Company I, 8th Regiment of the Georgia Volunteer Infantry of the Army of Northern Virginia on May 16, 1861.  He was wounded at Second Manassas on August 28, 1862, elected Major on December 16, 1862, and then was wounded again at Gettysburg on July 3, 1863.  He was assigned as Commandant of Post at Columbus, Georgia on June 10, 1864.  He applied to the Secretary of War for assignment to the Military Court of General Hampton, C.S.A., March 28, 1865.

See also

Edgar Gilmer Dawson, his younger brother

References
The Granite Farm Letters
Muster Roll of Company I, 8th Regiment 

People from Greene County, Georgia
Members of the Georgia House of Representatives
People of Georgia (U.S. state) in the American Civil War
1865 deaths
1825 births
Georgia (U.S. state) lawyers
Confederate States Army officers
19th-century American politicians
19th-century American lawyers